Chionodes luteogeminatus is a moth in the family Gelechiidae. It is found in North America, where it has been recorded from Iowa, Washington, Oregon and California.

The wingspan is about 22 mm.

The larvae feed on Eriogonum niveum.

References

Chionodes
Moths described in 1935
Moths of North America